Mario Rodríguez Ruiz, known as Mario Rodríguez (born 3 March 1997) is a Spanish footballer who plays as a left winger for Levante B

Club career
Born in Barcelona, Catalonia, Rodríguez joined Real Madrid's La Fábrica in 2011, from UE Cornellà. In 2016, after finishing his formation, he was promoted to the reserves in Segunda División B, and made his senior debut on 20 August of that year by starting in a 3–2 home win against Real Sociedad B.

On 3 August 2017, after featuring sparingly, Rodríguez was loaned to fellow third division side CE Sabadell FC, for one year. The following 10 July, he cut ties with Los Blancos and agreed to a contract with Girona FC, being assigned to farm team CF Peralada-Girona B still in division three.

On 30 July 2019, Rodríguez joined another reserve team, Club Recreativo Granada also in the third level. He made his first team debut on 17 December, starting in a 3–2 away win against CE L'Hospitalet, for the season's Copa del Rey.

Rodríguez made his La Liga debut on 1 July 2020, coming on as a late substitute for Gil Dias in a 2–0 away defeat of Deportivo Alavés.

On 15 September 2020, he moved to Poland and signed with Warta Poznań.

References

External links
 Real Madrid profile
 
 

1997 births
Living people
Footballers from Barcelona
Spanish footballers
Spain youth international footballers
Association football wingers
Real Madrid Castilla footballers
CE Sabadell FC footballers
CF Peralada players
Club Recreativo Granada players
Granada CF footballers
Warta Poznań players
La Liga players
Segunda División B players
Tercera División players
Ekstraklasa players
Spanish expatriate footballers
Expatriate footballers in Poland